Yeom Ki-Hun (Hanja: 
廉基勳; born 30 March 1983) is a South Korean football player who plays for Suwon Samsung Bluewings. Yeom made his way onto the national team following his continental performances. This tricky left winger has a penchant for scoring crucial goals, including one in the first leg of the AFC Champions League final.

On 16 December 2008, Yeom joined Premier League club West Bromwich Albion on a trial basis without receiving Ulsan's approval. He incurred blame for this incident.

Growth Background
He started playing soccer at Nonsan Middle School and graduated from Ganghyeong Commercial Information High School and Honam University. He was a modern pentathlete until elementary school and entered junior high school as a special student of the modern pentathlon but switched to soccer afterward.

Club career
He joined Jeonbuk Hyundai Motors in 2006 and made his professional debut. In July 2006, he was injured in a car accident with his teammate Kim Hyung-bum. After recovering, he made a big contribution to winning the AFC Champions League in 2006 and was awarded the K-League rookie award. In July 2007, he was transferred to Ulsan Hyundai in the face of Chung Kyung Ho and Yuh Yoon Hwan, and contributed to the 2007 League Cup. However, after transferring to Ulsan Hyundai, he suffered frequent injuries every year and failed to compete in many matches. In 2008, he made a dispute by moving to West Bromwich Albion FC of the English Premier League without the club's consent.

After a trade with Lee Jae-sung in 2010, he moved to Suwon Samsung Bluewings, but he was unable to play after the K-League opened in 2010 due to an injury. At the end of April 2010, he made his debut at the AFC Champions League Group Six qualifying match against Singapore Army Force FC. He helped the K-League in 2010 with 8 assists, and helped to win the FA Cup in 2010. In the 2011 season, Choi sung-kook who was the team's captain, was forced out of the team after being involved in a game of combat operation. Yeom ki-hoon was selected as a captain. After the season, he joined the Ansan Police Department for military service. In the 2013 season K-League Challenge, he played 21 games with 7 goals and 11 assists, led the team to second place, and received the 'assist king' of K-League Challenge.

He returned to Suwon after his military service and reapplied number 26, which he had vacated for two years. He led a 2–0 victory with a return to the Super Match at Suwon World Cup Stadium. In just three years ahead of the 2014 season, he was re-elected by team captains and made a big runner-up in the K-League Classic. He has signed a one-year contract with Suwon since the 2014 season.

On 23 September 2015, he helped the K-league team with 233 games and 68 assists in the away game against Jeonnam Dragons. Yeom Ki-hoon renewed previous record. He also signed the contract with Suwon until 2018, which is the best season of 2015.

After that, he recorded the 100th attack point in the league against Jeonbuk. And he 'Assist King' in the K-League Challenge and the K-League Classic. Both the Classic and the Challenge, both of which have never been before, have become the first players to win the 'Assist King'.

In the 2016 and 2017 seasons, he also captain of Suwon Samsung Bluewings. As a result, he became a captain for four consecutive years in Suwon Samsung Bluewings history. He played in the FA Cup final in 2016, defeating FC Seoul and leading the Suwon Samsung Bluewings to the FA Cup. He was selected as an MVP contestant. He was also honored as the FA Cup MVP for the first two consecutive years.

On 20 September 2017, Yeom Ki-hoon hit a two-digit assists record for the fifth time in his personal career against Jeju utd. On 23 September, he scored 1 goal in the match against Incheon utd and joined the 60-60 club in the K-League with 60 goals and 98 assists. He became a legend of the K-League. It can be seen that this is a record. During the 2018 season, he handed Kim Eun-seon the captain's armband. On 1 March 2018, he assisted Lee Ki-je's goal in his opening match against Jeonnam Dragons, and he made his first 100 assists in the K-League.

National Team career 
He made his debut in a friendly match with Ghana on 8 October 2006, and then participated in 2006 Asian Games and 2007 AFC Asian Cup. In the 2008 East Asian Cup, he became a co-top-scorer with Park Chu-young, Chong Dae-se and Yama Se goji. He played in the 2010 FIFA World Cup. And Germany's magazine, 'Kicker' gave '2nd good player' to Yeom Ki-hoon in the national team of Korea. He was selected the national team of Korea as the AFC Asian Cup 2011.

On 1 June 2015, he was included on the national team list for the first time after his departure as coach of Uli Stielike, in the friendly match against the United Arab Emirates and in the second qualifying round of the Russia World Cup with Myanmar. He made his comeback in the UAE on 11 June, and scored a free kick goal in the match.

In 2017 he was selected as national representative for the EAFF E-1 Football Championship. He also helped the team to a 4–1 victory by scoring a free kick goal against Japan.

Since then, he has been consistently selected as national representative and was expected to be a member of the Russian World Cup 2018. However, on 9 May 2018, he suffered a fracture of a rib in his team's clash with his opponent. As a result, he didn't make the final roster for the 2018 FIFA World Cup.

Club career statistics

Honours

Club

Jeonbuk Hyundai Motors
 AFC Champions League (1): 2006
 Suwon Samsung Bluewings
 FA Cup (3): 2010, 2016, 2019

International

 EAFF East Asian Cup (2): 2008, 2017

Individual

K League Young Player of the Year: 2006
FA Cup Most Valuable Player (2): 2010, 2016
K League 1 Best XI (3): 2011, 2015, 2017
K League 2 Best XI (1): 2013 
K League 2 Top Assists Award (1): 2013
K League 1 Top Assists Award (2): 2015, 2016
FA Cup Top Scorer (1): 2019

International goals
Scores and results list South Korea's goal tally first.

References

External links
 
 Yeom Ki-hun – National Team Stats at KFA 
 
 National Team Player Record 
 
 

1983 births
Living people
Association football midfielders
South Korean footballers
South Korea international footballers
2007 AFC Asian Cup players
2010 FIFA World Cup players
2011 AFC Asian Cup players
Jeonbuk Hyundai Motors players
Ulsan Hyundai FC players
Korean Police FC (Semi-professional) players
Suwon Samsung Bluewings players
K League 2 players
K League 1 players
Sportspeople from South Jeolla Province
Footballers at the 2006 Asian Games
Paju Yeom clan
Asian Games competitors for South Korea